William Isaac Fletcher (April 23, 1844 – June 15, 1917) was an American librarian, bibliographer, and indexer who served as the head librarian of Amherst College from 1883 to 1911 and the President of the American Library Association in 1891–92. In 1951, he was named by Library Journal to the Library Hall of Fame.

Background
Born in Burlington, Vermont, Fletcher grew up in Winchester, Massachusetts. After working as the Winchester town librarian in his teens, he got a job at the Boston Athenaeum when he was 18, working there under William Frederick Poole for five years. After a decade and a half of working at several other libraries in Massachusetts and Connecticut, Fletcher was hired by Amherst in November 1883.

Poole's Index to Periodical Literature
Fletcher served as the editor of four supplements (1893, 1897, 1903, and 1908) of the Poole's Index to Periodical Literature as well as of the 1893 and 1901 editions of the ALA Index to General Literature.

Fletcher married in 1869, and had two daughters and three sons.

References
 Bobinski, George S. "William Isaac Fletcher, an Early American Library Leader." The Journal of Library History, v5n2, Apr 1970, pgs. 101–118.
 "A Library Hall of Fame for the 75th Anniversary." Library Journal, v76, 15 Mar 1951, pgs. 466–472.

 

1844 births
1917 deaths
Writers from Burlington, Vermont
People from Winchester, Massachusetts
American librarians
Presidents of the American Library Association
American bibliographers